Teolindo Antonio Acosta Lázaro (July 23, 1937 — August 2, 2004) was a Venezuelan professional baseball player. Listed at 5' 7", 168 lb., he
batted and threw left handed.

Acosta was a distinguished batter in his homeland. As a result, many people called him, in friendly way,  as El Loquito que Inventó el Hit (the tiny crazy who invented the hit).

His skills were shown in his motherland with the Aguilas del Zulia, Cardenales de Lara, Industriales de Valencia, Licoreros de Pampero, Llaneros de Acarigua and Tigres de Araguaof the Venezuelan Professional Baseball League. Besides, Acosta played nine seasons in the Mexican League for the Leones de Yucatán, Pericos de Puebla, Tecolotes de Nuevo Laredo and Cardenales de Villahermosa, now known as Olmecas de Tabasco .

Along his prolific career of 23 years, Acosta won five batting crowns, two of them in his motherland and the rest of them in México.

Professional career

Early years 
Acosta broke into minor league baseball with the Class-D Dothan Cardinals of the Alabama–Florida League in 1958, batting .313 with 76 RBI and a league-leading 36 stolen bases in 124 games. For whatever reason, the parent Cincinnati Reds assigned him to Dothan for a second season in 1959, and he responded by bopping out a .337 average and again led the circuit with 46 steals. Sufficiently impressed, the Reds moved Acosta up to the Billings Mustangs of the Class C Pioneer League the next season, where he topped the loop with a .369 average (the first of his five pro batting crowns) and 45 swipes. He leapfrogged over B ball in 1961 to play for Class A Columbia Reds of the South Atlantic League, and once more was best in the league in batting (.343) and steals (40), marking his fourth consecutive stolen base titles.

Venezuelan Winter League (1956–1979)
Teolindo Acosta belong to a selected list of baseball players in Venezuela, who are in the top of several offensive departments; Acosta is the third in the list of most games played (1130); third in plate appearances (4324); he is fourth in Run scored (604); also he is third in hits (1289); additionally, is in the second place in Triples (56) and fourth in stolen bases (121).  Along his long career of twenty three years in the Venezuelan winter league, Acosta won two batting titles. In between, he spent part of the 1959–1960 season with the Gavilanes and Rapiños clubs of the rival Occidental League.

Mexico League (1968–1976)
Acosta was one of the top batters in Mexican baseball for nine seasons between 1968 and 1976, winning three batting titles in a six-year span.  Never a power hitter, the 5’6" 158-pound outfielder was a contact hitter who rarely struck out and sprayed the ball all over the field, similar in fashion to Rod Carew.

He cooled off a bit over the next few seasons, batting between .269 and 294 from 1962 through 1966, and after only hitting .238 for Buffalo of the International League over 49 games in 1967, he moved south to Mexico for the 1968 campaign with Puebla.

Acosta found his footing in the Mexican League, bettering .320 his first eight seasons. He hit .325 for the Pericos in 1968, followed by a Liga batting crown with a .354 average in 1969. Despite that, he moved on to Yucatán in 1970. After hitting .337 that season (including one game in which he went 6-for-6 with six runs), he was the top hitter in Mexico in 1971 with a career-high .392 BA and followed up with a solid .346 season in 1972.  Acosta returned to Puebla during his .375 campaign in 1973, and won his fifth and final batting championship in 1974 with a .366 showing. After hitting .320 for Villahermosa in 1975, he wrapped up his career as a 39-year-old with Nuevo Laredo in 1976 by batting .276, his only sub-.300 season in nine Mexican League campaigns.

The left-handed Acosta carried a lifetime .328 average in 19 seasons of professional baseball, collecting 2,724 hits with 64 homers and 389 stolen bases. He did even better in Mexico, knocking out a .345 batting average (sixth-best lifetime in the Liga) with 132 stolen bases.  He led all of professional baseball in batting in 1971 and 1974. Despite these figures, he is not a member of Mexican baseball's Salon de la Fama.

Career statistics
Note: Some statistics are incomplete because there are no records available.
Bold denotes category leader.

Batting

The Sunset of Warrior
Acosta, basically was sharing his time as active baseball player between México and Venezuela, and after 23 seasons, he decided to hung up his spikes in 1979 while he was playing with Cardenales de Lara in the Venezuelan winter league. Acosta retired with a lifetime .298 average, and five batting crowns in his pocket, two batting titles he won in Venezuela and the rest of them in México.

After retiring from winter ball in 1979, Acosta settled down in Valencia where died from heart problems on August 2, 2004 at 67.

Honors and Acknowledgments
In 2006 Acosta received the honor of induction into the Venezuelan Baseball Hall of Fame and Museum.

Sources 

 Treto Cisneros, Pedro (2002). The Mexican League/La Liga Mexicana: Comprehensive Player Statistics, 1937–2001. McFarland & Company. 
 Mexican Baseball Stars by John Phillips
 Nuñez, José Antero (1994). Serie del Caribe de la Habana a Puerto la Cruz. JAN Editor. 
 Gutiérrez, Daniel; Alvarez, Efraim; Gutiérrez (h), Daniel (1997). La Enciclopedia del Béisbol en Venezuela.
 Gutiérrez, Daniel; Alvarez, Efraim; Gutiérrez (h), Daniel (2006). La Enciclopedia del Béisbol en Venezuela. LVBP, Caracas.

External links 
 Teolindo Acosta player information from museodebeisbol.org 
 Venezuelan Professional Baseball League statistics

1937 births
2004 deaths
Águilas del Zulia players
Baseball outfielders
Billings Mustangs players
Cardenales de Lara players
Columbia Reds players
Dothan Cardinals players
Gavilanes de Maracaibo players
Industriales de Valencia players
Leones de Yucatán players
Licoreros de Pampero players
Llaneros de Acarigua players
Mexican League baseball players
Pericos de Puebla players
Rapiños de Occidente players
Sportspeople from Maracaibo
Tecolotes de Nuevo Laredo players
Tigres de Aragua players
Venezuelan expatriate baseball players in Mexico